Edmund Bannerman (1832 – 17 April 1903) was a journalist, newspaper proprietor, solicitor and man of public affairs in the British colony of the Gold Coast. He was one of many members of the Bannerman family who flourished in the 19th-century Gold Coast in various public activities.

Biography
Edmund Bannerman was born in 1832 in Accra, the third son of James Bannerman and Yaa Hom, daughter of the Asantehene (king of Asante) Osei Yaw Akoto. Bannerman was sent at the age of six to public school in his grandfather's native United Kingdom, where his brothers Charles and James were also being educated. 
 
Bannerman returned from Britain in 1847 and served for about nine years as secretary to several Gold Coast governors. He was known as the "Boss of Tarkwa", or "B of T", after his imposing residence, Tarqua(h) (Tarkwa) House, in Jamestown, Accra, and "he became popular with the Ga people for his agitation against policies of the colonial regime." In March 1858 he was appointed as Civil Commandant of Keta by the Secretary of State for the Colonies, and was made a Justice of the Peace. In 1860 he was transferred to Winneba in a similar capacity. In 1864, after leaving government service, he was admitted to practise as advocate and attorney in the Courts of the Settlements. In 1877 he practised as a solicitor and in 1879 was made a Commissioner of Oaths.

After the death of his brother Charles, he succeeded him as the proprietor and editor of the West African Herald. Bannerman was also a special correspondent to the West African Times.

He died at the age of 71, on 17 April 1903, at his residence in Jamestown, Accra.

See also
 Gold Coast Euro-Africans

References

External links
 "The Bannerman Political Family and the Imperial Franchise (1850-63)", Joy Online, 4 March 2019.

1832 births
1903 deaths
Ghanaian journalists
Newspaper publishers (people)
Ghanaian people of Scottish descent
Gold Coast (British colony) judges
People from Accra
Justices of the peace